Founded in 1990 in Rome, the European Society for the Study of English (ESSE) is the largest and most comprehensive organization for university teachers and researchers in English Studies, including literature, linguistics, and cultural studies, throughout Europe. It is an association (Verein) conformable to articles 60ff of the Swiss Civil Code (ZGB) with its seat in Basle. As stated in the 2022 ESSE Treasurer's Report for the ESSE Board Meeting in Mainz, 28 August 2022 (p. 4), currently, ESSE has 33 national associations and, according to the November 2021 membership lists, there are 7,590 members of ESSE.

National associations 
ESSE is a European federation of national higher educational associations for the study of English. The following European national associations are affiliated to ESSE:  Albanian Society for the Study of English (Albania), Armenian Association for the Study of English (Armenia), Austrian Association for University Teachers of English (Austria), Belgian Association of Anglicists in Higher Education (Belgium), Bosnia-and Herzegovina (Bosnia and Herzegovina), Bulgarian Society of British Studies (Bulgaria), Hrvatsko drustvo anglistickih studija (Croatia), Czech Association for the Study of English (Czech Republic), Danish Association of English Studies (Denmark), Finnish Society for the Study of English (Finland), Société des Anglicistes de l'Enseignement Supérieur (France), Deutscher Anglistenverband (Germany), Hellenic Association  for the Study of English (Greece), Hungarian Society for the Study of English (Hungary), NAES (Republic of Ireland), Associazione Italiana di Anglistica (Italy), Lithuanian Association of University Teachers of English (Lithuania), Association for the Study of English in Malta (Malta), Montenegrin Society for the Study of English (Montenegro), Norwegian Society for English Studies (Norway), Polish Association for the Study of English (Poland), Associação Portuguesa de Estudos Anglo-Americanos (Portugal), Romanian Society for English and American Studies (Romania), Russian Association for English Studies (Russia), Serbian Association for the Study of English (Serbia), Slovenska asociacia pre studium anglictiny (Slovakia), Slovensko Drustvo za Angleske Studije (Slovenia), Asociación Española de Estudios Anglo-Norteamericanos (Spain), Swedish Society for the Study of English (Sweden), Swiss Association of University Teachers of English (Switzerland), English Language and Literature Research Association (Turkey), and University English (United Kingdom).

Affiliation 
ESSE is a member of The International Federation for Modern Languages and Literatures (FILLM).

President, Executive, and Board 
The past Presidents of ESSE have been Piero Boitani (1990–95), Helmut Bonheim (1995–2001), Adolphe Haberer (2001–07), Fernando Galván (2007-13) and Liliane Louvel (2013-19). Today, the President of ESSE is Prof. Andreas H. Jucker (University of Zurich, Switzerland). The President leads an Executive which also includes a Secretary (Professor Biljana Mišić Ilić, University of Niš, Serbia) and Treasurer (Professor Gašper Ilc, University of Ljubljana, Slovenia). The Executive meets regularly with the ESSE Board, which consists of representatives from each of the national organizations.

Activities 
Conforming to its Constitution (4. Activities), the activities of ESSE include providing a network for communication between individuals working in English Studies, publication of journals, allocation of bursaries and book prizes to outstanding works in the field of English studies, and organization of regular international conferences. Therefore, one of ESSE’s main aims is to assist young scholars in different countries with documentation and resourcing. In this respect, ESSE offers a bursary scheme to help support young academics, and provides book grants to researchers. ESSE also awards prizes to junior and senior scholars for books they wrote in the field of English studies (literature, language, cultural and area studies). Besides, ESSE offers financial support for parallel lecture speakers at ESSE conferences and for plenary speakers at national conferences of affiliated national associations. In parallel, ESSE also organises a Doctoral Symposium, open to PhD students who are writing their theses in English Studies.

Publications 
As stipulated in its Constitution (4.3), ESSE is the editor of a biannual publication which was issued as a newsletter under the name The European English Messenger, in printed format (1990-2015). In 2016 it became an online publication, an academic journal renamed The ESSE Messenger. ESSE also edits The European Journal of English Studies, published by Routledge.

Conferences 
The Society holds biennial conferences with approximately 400-700 participants (cf. Constitution 4.1). The ESSE conferences consist of plenary and parallel lectures, seminars, round tables, and other events covering all aspects of English Studies including literature, linguistics and cultural and area studies. ESSE conferences have taken place so far in: Norwich (1991), Bordeaux (1993), Glasgow (1995), Debrecen (1997), Helsinki (2000), Strasbourg (2002), Zaragoza (2004), London (2006) , Aarhus (2008), Turin (2010), Istanbul (2012), Kosice (2014), Galway (2016), Brno (2018), Lyon (2020, postponed to 2021 because of the covid-19 pandemic) and Mainz (2022). The next ESSE conference will take place in Lausanne in 2024.

See also 
 List of language regulators - there isn't one for English

References

Further reading 
Engler, Balz, and Renate Haas, eds. The European History of English Studies: Contributions towards the History of a Discipline. Leicester: The English Association, for ESSE, 2000.
The European Society for the Study of English and The British Council. "A Survey of English Studies in Europe at the Turn of the Century". Comp. Martin A. Kayman with the assistance of Filomena Mesquita. The European English Messenger 14.1 (Spring 2005): 15-30.

External links 
 Society's website

English-language education
Pan-European learned societies
Literary societies